The Governor of Antique is the chief executive of the provincial government of Antique, Philippines. Like all local government heads in the Philippines, the governor is elected via popular vote, and may not be elected for a fourth consecutive term (although the former governor may return to office after an interval of one term). In case of death, resignation or incapacity, the vice governor becomes the governor.

The current governor is Rhodora Cadiao, who has been assuming the post since 2016.

List of governors

Spanish governors of Antique province

Revolutionary government

American governors

Filipino governors

References

 
Governors of provinces of the Philippines